Granastyochus is a genus of beetles in the family Cerambycidae, containing the following species:

 Granastyochus elegantissimus (Tippmann, 1953)
 Granastyochus fulgidus Monné & Martins, 1976
 Granastyochus intricatus Monné & Martins, 1976
 Granastyochus nigropunctatus (Bates, 1881)
 Granastyochus picticauda (Bates, 1881)
 Granastyochus trifasciatus Gilmour, 1959

References

Acanthocinini